Selwyn Riumana (born June 30, 1966) is a member of the National Parliament of the Solomon Islands. He lives in Isabel Province, and previously served as Minister of Agriculture and Livestock of the Solomon Islands.

References

1966 births
Living people
Members of the National Parliament of the Solomon Islands
People from Isabel Province
Government ministers of the Solomon Islands
Place of birth missing (living people)